The Pearl of the Orient is a 1921 German silent adventure film directed by Karlheinz Martin and starring Viggo Larsen, Carola Toelle and Tzwetta Tzatschewa. It premiered in Berlin on 12 August 1921.

Cast
 Viggo Larsen as Maharadscha von Shivaji
 Carola Toelle as  Inge, seine Frau
 Tzwetta Tzatschewa as Lieblingssklavin Sidara
 Ferdinand von Alten as Radscha von Singalundi
 Lewis Brody as Diener des Radschas
 Magda Madeleine
 H. von Maixdorff
 Rolf Prasch
 Loni Nest

References

Bibliography
 Grange, William. Cultural Chronicle of the Weimar Republic.Scarecrow Press, 2008.

External links

1921 films
Films of the Weimar Republic
German silent feature films
German adventure films
German black-and-white films
1921 adventure films
Films directed by Karlheinz Martin
Silent adventure films
1920s German films
1920s German-language films